John Kerrigan may refer to:
John Kerrigan, one of several noms de plume of Charles Whiting (1926–2007), British novelist and historian
John Kerrigan (literary scholar) (born 1956), professor of English at Cambridge University
John Kerrigan (New York City) (born 1851), New York politician
John E. Kerrigan (1908–1987), U.S. politician
J. Warren Kerrigan (1879–1947), American actor
John J. Kerrigan (1932–1996), member of the Boston School Committee, 1968–1976